Dallas International University (DIU) is an undergraduate school and graduate school located in the southwest corner of Dallas, Texas, formerly called the Graduate Institute of Applied Linguistics. From its beginning in 1998, DIU provided education for applied linguistics and language development work in marginalized language communities around the world. Courses are offered in such areas as  macro-sociolinguistics, multilingual education, language survey, translation, descriptive linguistics. 

The name was changed to "Dallas International University" in 2018. Since then, in addition to an MA degree program in World Arts (ethnomusicology and other arts) started in 2008, a PhD program was launched in 2019. Dallas International University is accredited as a "Level V" university by the Southern Association of Colleges and Schools Commission on Colleges to award BA, MA, and PhD degrees.

Dallas International also offers undergraduate courses leading toward a bachelor’s degree, which may also be taken as post-baccaleareate prerequisites for its graduate programs. The student body averages around 200 students.  Alumni of Dallas International University have gone on to work in over 80 countries.

References

Universities and colleges in Dallas
Linguistics organizations
Educational institutions established in 1998
Universities and colleges accredited by the Southern Association of Colleges and Schools
1998 establishments in Texas
Private universities and colleges in Texas